Franklin Township is one of five townships in Floyd County, Indiana. As of the 2010 census, its population was 1,499 and it contained 621 housing units. While Franklin Township, along with Lafayette Township are the only two townships in the county without an incorporated community, Franklin Township is by far the least populous township.

History
The Gabriel Farnsley House was listed on the National Register of Historic Places in 1982.

Geography
Arrowhead Lake is in this township.

Unincorporated towns
 Buchanan
(This list is based on USGS data and may include former settlements.)

Adjacent townships
 New Albany Township (northeast)
 Posey Township, Harrison County (southwest)
 Franklin Township, Harrison County (west)
 Georgetown Township (northwest)

Major highways
 Indiana State Road 11
 Indiana State Road 62
 Indiana State Road 111

Cemeteries
The township contains four cemeteries: Bailey, Hopewell, Wheeler and Wolfe.

References
 
 United States Census Bureau cartographic boundary files

External links
 Indiana Township Association
 United Township Association of Indiana

Townships in Floyd County, Indiana
Townships in Indiana